Dikembe is an American rock band from Gainesville, Florida.

History
Dikembe formed in December 2010. In 2011, the band embarked on a winter tour with You Blew It!. In 2012, they signed to Tiny Engines and released their debut studio album titled Broad Shoulders. Kenny Jewett left the band in 2013 and was replaced with Randy Reddell. The band went on a summer tour in 2013 with Signals Midwest. They released their second studio album in 2014, titled Mediumship. They released their third studio album, Hail Something, as a 3-piece on their newly formed Death Protector Collective label. In October 2017 Andy Anaya of You Blew It! joined Dikembe on guitar. In 2020 they signed to Skeletal Lightning and released their 4th LP, Muck, their first with guitarist Andy Anaya.

Band members

Current Members 
David Bell - drums (2010-present)
Steven Gray - guitar/vocals (2010-present)
Randy Reddell - bass (2013-present)
Andy Anaya - guitar (2017-present)
Scott Carr - guitar (2022-present)

Past Members 

 Ryan Willems - guitar (2010-2016)
 Kenny Jewett - bass (2011-2013)
 Mike Jones - guitar (2015)
 Nick Nottebaum - bass (2018)
 Ross Papitto - bass (2014)
 Max Stern - guitar (2015) Fest 14 only 
 Evan Weiss - vocals (2015) Fest 14 only 
 Christian Holden - vocals (2015) Fest 14 only

Discography
Studio albums
Broad Shoulders (2012)
Mediumship (2014)
Hail Something (2016)
Muck (2020)
EPs
Chicago Bowls (2011)
Ledge (2015)
Game Over (2021)
Live Albums
Live at Loosey's (2016)
Splits
Dikembe / You Blew It! - Fulfill the Prophecy (2011)
Dikembe / Hightide Hotel / Jet Set Sail / Monument (2013)
Dikembe / The Hotelier / Modern Baseball / Old Gray / Empire! Empire! (I Was a Lonely Estate) / Pentimento - Fest 12"
Pet Symmetry / Dikembe (2013)
Dikembe / Jazz June (2014)
Dikembe / Prince Daddy & The Hyena / Expert Timing / Henrietta - DPC Mixtape #1 (2017)

References

Musical groups from Gainesville, Florida
2011 establishments in Florida
Musical groups established in 2011
Count Your Lucky Stars Records artists
Emo musical groups from Florida
Emo revival groups
Tiny Engines artists